Alain Schmitt (born 2 November 1983) is a French judoka.

Achievements

References

External links

 
 
 
 

1983 births
Living people
French male judoka
Jewish French sportspeople
Jewish martial artists
Judoka at the 2012 Summer Olympics
Olympic judoka of France
21st-century French people